Old Church is an unincorporated community in Hanover County in the Central Region of the U.S. state of Virginia. Formerly consisting primarily of farmland, today Old Church includes many residents who commute to jobs in the metropolitan Richmond area.

Old Church is also known for a Civil War campaign in the area. U.S. Brig. Gen. Alfred Torbert defeated C.S. Brig. Gen. Matthew C. Butler's forces, resulting in about 900 casualties.

References

External links
Hanover County Economic Development

Unincorporated communities in Hanover County, Virginia
Unincorporated communities in Virginia